The Scuderia Cameron Glickenhaus SCG 004 is a sports car developed and manufactured by American boutique car maker Scuderia Cameron Glickenhaus LLC. It is the manufacturer's second model after the 003 of 2017.

The SCG 004S was unveiled by Scuderia Cameron Glickenhaus in November 2017. In August 2020, the manufacturer presented the production version of the 004S and announced the start of production for October 2020 at the Connecticut plant in the United States.

Variants

SCG 004S
The 004S or "Stradale" (Street) is the road-going version of the 004 series. The 004S adopts a retro design reminiscent of old supercars such as the Maserati MC12 of 2004 or the Ferrari P4/5 by Pininfarina for James Glickenhaus in 2006. It has the particularity of the arrangement of three passengers with the driver's seat in a central position as the McLaren F1 or the recent Gordon Murray Automotive T.50.

SCG 004C

The SCG 004C or "Competizione" (Competition) is the racing variant of the 004 series. The car is developed to ultimately serve as a platform for LM GTE, GTLM, GT3, and GT4 categories as well as Germany's NLS series. It's powered by the 6.2-liter naturally aspirated V8 engine based on GM's LT4 block, developed by Autotechnica Motori. The car made its debut in the 2020 24 Hours of Nürburgring and finished 14th overall. In 2022 it was confirmed that Glickenhaus aimed for the car to make its Le Mans debut in the GT3 class in 2024.

SCG 004CS
The SCG 004CS or "Competizione Stradale" (Street Competition) is a version that can swap between road and race configurations. This version can be driven on the road, but with a few simple modifications becomes a homologated race car that can be a track day car.

References

Sports cars
004
Cars introduced in 2020